The 1949 Saint Mary's Gaels football team was an American football team that represented Saint Mary's College of California during the 1949 college football season. In their second and final season under head coach Joe Verducci, the Gaels compiled a 3–6–1 record and were outscored by opponents by a combined total of 243 to 168.

In February 1950, Verducci resigned as the Gaels' head football coach to accept the same position at San Francisco State College.

Schedule

References

Saint Mary's
Saint Mary's Gaels football seasons
Saint Mary's Gaels football